The First ministry of Armand-Emmanuel du Plessis de Richelieu was formed on 26 September 1815 after the dismissal of the Ministry of Charles-Maurice de Talleyrand-Périgord by King Louis XVIII of France. It was dissolved on 29 December 1818 and replaced by the Ministry of Jean-Joseph Dessolles.

Formation and actions
After the resignation of Talleyrand, Louis XVIII designated the technocrat Duke of Richelieu to form a cabinet. The minister of the Richelieu ministry were Ultras and counter-revolutionaries hostile to Bonapartism and republicanism, and in the first phase of the ministry they actualized the legal terror called "Second White Terror", that caused the exile, the imprisonment or the execution of several revolutionaries.

After the election held in 1816, the new Parliament, led by a Doctrinaire majority, forced the resignation of several ministers, replaced with Doctrinaires and moderates. The reformed cabinet realised several important laws, like the "Saint-Cyr Law" (abolition of the nobility's privilege in the army) and the "Lainé Law" (expansion of the suffrage and direct votation).
However, after the partial-election of 1817, a new Liberal leftist group was formed in the Chamber of Deputies, composed by radicals like General Maximilien Foy and Abbot Henri Grégoire.
There was also a rising rivality between Richelieu and his Minister Élie Decazes, a popular Doctrinaire. Finally, at the end of December 1818, Richelieu resigned after he lost the favour of the Ultras and the support of the Doctrinaires.

Ministers

Changes
On 7 May 1816:

On 19 January 1817:

On 23 June 1817:

On 12 September 1817:

On 7 December 1818:

References

Sources

French governments
1815 establishments in France
1818 disestablishments in France
Cabinets established in 1815
Cabinets disestablished in 1818